The 1946 U.S. Women's Open was a golf tournament contested from August 26 to September 1 at Spokane Country Club, north of Spokane, Washington. It was the first edition of the U.S. Women's Open, and only one to have been played in match play competition. The field of 39 women was reduced to the 32-player match play field by a 36-hole qualifier on Monday and Tuesday. Six professionals and 26 amateurs advanced to match play. The format was 18-hole matches through the quarterfinals, and 36 holes for the semifinals and finals.

Professionals Patty Berg and Betty Jameson reached the Sunday final.  Jameson led by three after seven holes, but Berg evened the match and they finished the first 18 holes all square. After lunch, Berg needed only fourteen holes in the afternoon to close out the match at 5 & 4. Berg won $5,600 and Jameson $3,100, all in war bonds. This win was later  recognized as Berg's sixth major championship. 
The winner's share at the U.S. Women's Open was substantially less in succeeding years and was not exceeded until 1972, 26 years later.

Jameson won the title the following year as a 72-hole stroke play event.

Founded in 1898, Spokane Country Club was purchased by the Kalispel Tribe in late 2015 and is now Kalispell Golf and Country Club.

Qualifying scores and final results

 (a) denotes amateur

Bracket

Final match scorecards
Morning

Afternoon

Source:

References

External links
USGA final leaderboard
U.S. Women's Open Golf Championship
Kalispell Golf and Country Club

U.S. Women's Open
Golf in Washington (state)
Sports competitions in Spokane, Washington
Sports competitions in Washington (state)
U.S. Women's Open
U.S. Women's Open
U.S. Women's Open
U.S. Women's Open
U.S. Women's Open
Women's sports in Washington (state)